M. A. Abdul Majeed (15 October 1926 – 29 November 2011) was a Sri Lankan politician, Member of Parliament and deputy minister.

Early life and family
Majeed was born on 15 October 1926. His family hailed from Vanniya in Sammanthurai in south-eastern Ceylon. He was educated at Batticaloa Shivananda Vidyalayam and Jaffna Central College. After school Majeed joined University of Ceylon, Colombo, graduating in 1950 with BA degree in economics.

Majeed married R. Kadeeja and had five children. A. M. M. Naushad was his son-in-law.

Career
In 1954 Majeed entered local politics, serving as chairman of Sammanthurai Town Council until 1960.

Majeed contested the March 1960 parliamentary election as an independent candidate in Pottuvil and was elected to Parliament. He was re-elected at the July 1960 and 1965 parliamentary elections. He contested the 1970 parliamentary election as a United National Party (UNP) candidate and was re-elected. He switched to the Sammanthurai constituency at the 1977 parliamentary election and was elected to Parliament. He was appointed a UNP National List MP after the 1989 parliamentary election.

Majeed served in several deputy ministerial positions when the UNP was in power between 1977 and 1994: Agriculture and Lands (1977–78); Power and Highways (1978–80); Power and Energy (1980–81); Post and Telecommunication (1981–89); and Handloom Industries (1989–94). He was also District Minister for Batticaloa (1981–89).

Death
Majeed died on 29 November 2011 at Sammanthurai Base Hospital.

References

1926 births
2011 deaths
Alumni of Jaffna Central College
Alumni of the University of Ceylon
Deputy ministers of Sri Lanka
Members of the 4th Parliament of Ceylon
Members of the 5th Parliament of Ceylon
Members of the 6th Parliament of Ceylon
Members of the 7th Parliament of Ceylon
Members of the 8th Parliament of Sri Lanka
Members of the 9th Parliament of Sri Lanka
People from Eastern Province, Sri Lanka
Sri Lankan Muslims
United National Party politicians